This is a list of fighter aces in World War II from China. For other countries see List of World War II aces by country

C 
Chen Chi-Wei
Chen Jui-tien
Chow Che-Kei
Chow Ting-fong
Chu Chin-Hsun

H 
Huang Shing-Yui
Hwang Pei-yang

K 
Kao Chi-Hang
Kao Yu-hsin (Kao Yau-Hain)
Kuan (Kun, Kan) Tan (USAAF)
Kwang Hsin-Jui

L 
Le Yi-Chin
Li Kwei-Tan (12)
Liu Chi-Sheng
Liu Chui-Kang
Liu Chung-Wu
Lo Chu (Chi)
Lu Ji-Chun

M 
Mao Yin-Chu

T 
Tsang Tsi-Lan (USAAF)

W 
Wang  Kuang-Fu (USAAF)
John Wong Pan-yang – an American aviator who volunteered to serve in the Chinese Air Force in the looming war against the Japanese
John "Buffalo" Huang Xinrui – an American aviator who volunteered to serve in the Chinese Air Force in the looming war against the Japanese

Y 
Yuan Pao-Kang
Yue Yiqin

Z 
Zhu Jia-Xun

References

Bibliography 
 Cheung, Raymond. Aces of the Republic of China Air Force. Oxford: Osprey Publishing, 2015. .

China
World War II flying aces